There Will Be No Miracles Here is a 2018 memoir by Casey Gerald.

Further reading

External links 
 

2018 non-fiction books
African-American autobiographies
American memoirs
English-language books
Riverhead Books books